Alejandro Díaz can refer to:

 Alejandro Díaz (athlete) (1920–2004), Chilean Olympic athlete
 Alejandro Díaz (gymnast) (1924–2002), Cuban Olympic gymnast
 Alejandro Díaz (baseball) (born 1975), Dominican Republic baseball player
 Alejandro Díaz (footballer) (born 1996), Mexican footballer